Cosima is the self-titled debut album by Australian Idol finalist and Australian singer Cosima De Vito, released in 2004 (see 2004 in music). The album features the Cold Chisel-cover and power ballad hit single "When the War Is Over" and songs penned by American songwriter Diane Warren. Originally conceived for the end of 2003, the recording of the album was delayed due to Cosima's acute vocal cord illness.

Chart performance
Upon its debut the album hit number two, very nearly missing the top position. The album missed out on the pole position to Maroon 5's Songs About Jane by a matter of a few hundred copies. While this was a very high debut for an independent artist, the following weeks saw the album drop very quickly until it was out of the Top fifty within a matter of weeks (it dropped to number fourteen in only its second week). In the subsequent weeks, due to the lack of a strong radio single, the album dropped with little to push it up except Cosima's star power.

Despite its short run on the charts, the album has been a consistent seller due to various events Cosima has participated in since its release. To date it has sold over 50,000 copies .

Track listing
All songs written by Diane Warren.
 "One Night Without You" – 4:52
 "Cost of Love" – 3:33
 "Show Me the Way Back to Your Heart" – 3:42
 "What Kind of World Would This World Be" – 4:31
 "Painted on My Heart" – 3:33
 "Now That You Can't Have Me" – 3:25
 "Too Lost in You" – 4:37
 "What My Heart Says" – 3:45
 "I Just Wanna Cry" – 3:46
 "Taste the Tears" – 3:45
Bonus CD
 "When the War Is Over" (Steve Prestwich) – 3:48

Charts

Personnel
 Cosima De Vito – Vocals, background vocals
 Diane Warren – Songwriter, producer
 Khris Kellow – Producer, keyboards, programming
 Peter Stengaard – Producer, keyboards, guitar, bass, percussions, drums, programming, background vocals
 Mario Luccy – Mixing and engineering
 Michael Anthony – Executive producer
 Julie Horton – A&R
 Josh Sklair – Guitars
 Lenny Castro – Percussion
 Thomas Stengaard – Additional programming
 Steve Marcussen – Mastering
 Shelley Roye – Design
 David Anderson – Photography
 Glenn Pokorny – Photography assistant
 Fernando Barraza – Stylist
 Jen Erdahl – Hair and make-up
 Beverley Gay – Hair and make-up

References

2004 debut albums
Cosima De Vito albums